Joseph Byrne may refer to:
Joseph Byrne (Australian politician) (1893–1973), Australian politician, representing Parramatta
Joseph Byrne (bishop) (1843–1901), Australian Roman Catholic Bishop of Bathurst
Joseph Byrne (British Army officer) (1874–1942), Royal Irish Constabulary's Inspector-General, 1916–1920
Joseph Byrne (Holby City), a fictional character in the BBC medical drama Holby City
Joe Byrne (1857–1880), Australian bushranger and member of the Kelly Gang
Joe Byrne (Northern Ireland politician) (born 1953), Nationalist politician in Northern Ireland
Joe Byrne, Newfoundland folk musician, see Pat and Joe Byrne
Joseph R. Byrne (1921–1990), Newfoundland hockey coach from Quebec
Joe Byrne (Canadian politician) (born 1961), leader of the New Democratic Party of Prince Edward Island

See also
Joseph Burn (1871–1950), chairman of the Prudential Insurance company
Joseph Burns (disambiguation)